Horse Creek is an unincorporated community and census-designated place (CDP) in Mellette County, South Dakota, United States. It was first listed as a CDP prior to the 2020 census. The population of the CDP was 187 at the 2020 census.

The Little White River flows from north to south through the CDP, with most of the community's development to the east of the river on high ground.

U.S. Route 83 runs along the eastern edge of the CDP, leading north through White River  to Interstate 90 at Murdo and south  to Mission. South Dakota Highway 44 leads east-southeast from the CDP  to Winner. Highway 44 follows US 83 north to White River, then turns west and leads  to Interior, near Badlands National Park.

Demographics

References 

Census-designated places in Mellette County, South Dakota
Census-designated places in South Dakota